Daniel Johansson (born July 28, 1987) is a Swedish football player, who currently plays as defender for Stafsinge IF.

Starting his football career in Falkenberg and the club Stafsinge IF, at the age of 17 he moved south to Halmstads BK's youth team, he has played his way through the club's youth system and in 2008 he took the final step to the senior team.

On 17 December 2008 it was reported that Halmstads BK would not offer him a new contract and that he had signed for Falkenbergs FF.

References

External links
  
 

1987 births
Living people
Swedish footballers
Association football defenders
Allsvenskan players
Superettan players
Halmstads BK players
Falkenbergs FF players